Roger Derek Robinson (born 1939) is a New Zealand academic, essayist, editor, runner, sportswriter, and sports commentator. Robinson earned his Ph.D. from the University of Cambridge and moved to New Zealand in 1968, where he became an English professor at Victoria University of Wellington. He has expertise in New Zealand literature (co-editing The Oxford Companion to New Zealand Literature in 1998) and literature and journalism relating to running. He has written and edited several books about running, including When Running Made History (2018), and received awards for his sporting journalism. As a runner, he competed internationally from 1966 to 1995 and won marathons at a Masters level in the 1980s.

Early life and literary career
Robinson was born in Sutton Coldfield on 1939, and grew up in London. He earned a master's degree and PhD from the University of Cambridge, and moved to New Zealand in 1968, becoming a naturalised New Zealand citizen in 1977. He became a lecturer at the University of Canterbury. In 1975 he was appointed professor of English at Victoria University in Wellington.   He served as dean and vice-chancellor of the university, and head of the English department, during his tenure. For many years, from the 1980s onwards, he divided his time between New Zealand and the United States, holding visiting academic positions at New York University and the Newberry Library in Chicago. In 1981 he founded the first academic journal for New Zealand literature, the Journal of New Zealand Literature, and its first issue was published in 1983. 

Together with Nelson Wattie, Robinson edited The Oxford Companion to New Zealand Literature (1998), and himself contributed over 300 entries. It has been described by academic Alan Riach as "indispensable" and a "masterpiece". In 2003 he edited Robert Louis Stevenson: His Best Pacific Writings which was a finalist for the Montana New Zealand Book Awards in 2004. His work has been published in Landfall, The Dictionary of New Zealand Biography, The Oxford Companion to Twentieth Century Poetry (1996) and Readings in Pacific Literature (1993). 

Robinson's 2003 book Running in Literature was the first to discuss running as a subject in literature. He was the scriptwriter for running documentary Marathon: A Hero's Journey (Cultural Horizons, 1990). In 2001 he was listed as an outstanding American sportswriter in The Best American Sports Writing. He wrote as a senior journalist for Running Times for many years, and received awards for this work; in 2007 he won the Les Diven Media Award for his coverage of the Boilermaker Road Race, and in 2010 he received an award for excellence in running journalism from the Road Runners Club of America. He has said of his literary work: "Without being pretentious, I want to show running as a subject really worth writing well about, at the absolutely top quality that would apply to professorial work."

In 2011 a Festschrift (collection of tributes) to Robinson with over 50 contributors was published, titled Running Writing Robinson. It included essays and poems as "a gift to and a celebration of Roger Robinson". Contributors included New Zealand writers Fiona Kidman, Joy Cowley and Witi Ihimaera and runner Lorraine Moller.

In 2018 he published When Running Made History, a non-fiction work about the history of running and tracing its development into a professional sport. In a review for Outside, Amby Burfoot called it "one of the best running books ever written—if not the very best". Geoff Watson in the New Zealand Review of Books praised Robinson's tracing of the development of running as a sport. He said the book "has been widely and rightfully acclaimed [and] is among the most readable and rewarding works of sports history ever published". In the same year, he received a media reporting excellence award from the American Academy of Orthopaedic Surgeons for an article about his knee replacement surgeries.

Sporting career and personal life
As a nine-year-old Robinson saw Emil Zátopek win the 10,000m event at the 1948 Summer Olympics, which inspired him to start running seriously. He began competing in running events for England in 1966, and would later compete for New Zealand internationally until 1995, including representing New Zealand at the 1977 IAAF World Cross Country Championships. In the 1980s, Robinson won his Masters age category at the Boston Marathon (2:20:15 in 1984), the Vancouver Marathon, and the New York City Marathon. For forty years he worked as an announcer or commentator for sporting events, including notably the 10,000m race at the 1974 Commonwealth Games, won by Dick Tayler, and the 1981 New York City Marathon.

In 1983, Robinson met runner and author Kathrine Switzer while speaking at a running national championship in New Zealand. They married in 1987. Robinson has two children from a previous marriage. In 2006, Robinson and Switzer co-authored 26.2: Marathon Stories, an illustrated history of the marathon. In 2016 they both appeared in the Swiss documentary film Free to Run, about the history of marathon running. He has continued running into his 70s and 80s following knee replacements in his right leg in 2011 and in his left leg in 2017; he has nicknamed his knees Russell and Mark respectively, after the surgeons who carried out the operations. In 2019 he established the Roger Robinson Scholarship for competitive runners at Victoria University. In February 2022 he held the over-80s New Zealand men's mile record, and in May 2022 won the men's over-80 category of the National Senior Games 10K in Florida.  Robinson and Switzer divide their time between homes in New Paltz and New Zealand.

Of continuing to race into his 80s, Robinson has said:

Selected works

As editor
 The Way of All Flesh by Samuel Butler (Pan Classics, 1976) (includes introduction and notes)
 Poems for the Eighties (Wai-te-ata Press, 1979)
 Katherine Mansfield: In from the Margin (Louisianan State University Press, 1994)
 The Oxford Companion to New Zealand Literature (Oxford University Press, 1998), with Nelson Wattie
 Writing Wellington: Twenty Years of Victoria University Writing Fellows (Victoria University Press, 1999)
 Anno Domini 2000: or Woman's Destiny by Julius Vogel (Exisle, 2000, University of Hawaii Press, 2002) (includes introduction)
 The God Boy by Ian Cross (Penguin Modern Classics, 2003) (includes introduction)
 Robert Louis Stevenson: His Best Pacific Writings (Streamline & Bess Press, 2003)

Essays
 Introduction to Pocket Collected Poems by Alistair Te Ariki Campbell (Hazard Press, 1996)
 Essay on Thomas Hardy in The Oxford Reader's Companion to Hardy (OUP, 2000)

Non-fiction
 Landscapes (Art Society Press, 1963)
 Victoriana (Art Society Press, 1963, revised ed. 1967)
 Heroes and Sparrows: a Celebration of Running (Southwester, 1986) 
 A Hero's Journey (Cultural Horizons, 1990) (documentary script)
 The Story of Hong Gildong (Wai-te-ata Press, 1995)
 Running in Literature (Breakaway Books, 2003) 
 26.2: Marathon Stories (Rodale, 2006), together with Kathrine Switzer
 When Running Made History (Syracuse University Press, 2018)
 Running Throughout Time: The Greatest Running Stories Ever Told (Meyer & Meyer Sport, 2022)

References

External links 
 
 Profile on Read NZ Te Pou Muramura
 Staff profile at Victoria University of Wellington
 "Why I Still Love Racing at Age 82", article by Robinson for Outside, 21 December 2021

1939 births
Living people
People from Sutton Coldfield
Sportspeople from Sutton Coldfield
English emigrants to New Zealand
20th-century New Zealand journalists
20th-century New Zealand male writers
20th-century New Zealand non-fiction writers
21st-century New Zealand journalists
21st-century New Zealand male writers
21st-century New Zealand non-fiction writers
Academic staff of the University of Canterbury
Academic staff of the Victoria University of Wellington
Alumni of the University of Cambridge
New Zealand male marathon runners
New Zealand male cross country runners
English male marathon runners
English male cross country runners
Sport of athletics journalists
English sportswriters
Naturalised citizens of New Zealand